Eggstedt is a municipality in the district of Dithmarschen, in Schleswig-Holstein, Germany. Eggstedt is a part of the Kaiser-Tour in 2010.

References

Dithmarschen